Michael J. Graham is an American Jesuit priest and educator who was the president of Xavier University between 2001 and 2021.

Early life and education
Michael Graham was born in Cedar Rapids, Iowa.

Graham graduated from Cornell College with a Bachelor of Science. Additionally, Graham earned a Master of Arts degrees in American Studies and psychology, and a doctorate in American Studies from the University of Michigan. Graham was ordained a priest in 1988.

Career
In 1989, Graham became an assistant professor of history at Xavier, and was the director of the university scholars program. In 1994 Graham was appointed vice president for university relations until 1999 when he became executive assistant to President James E. Hoff. In 2001, Graham became the 34th president of Xavier University until retiring on June 30, 2021.

References

20th-century American Jesuits
21st-century American Jesuits
People from Cedar Rapids, Iowa
Xavier University people
Cornell College alumni
University of Michigan alumni
Living people
Year of birth missing (living people)
Presidents of Xavier University
Catholics from Iowa